Natalie Portman (born Natalie Hershlag) is an Israeli-born American actress. She has had a prolific film career since her teenage years and has starred in various blockbusters and independent films, receiving multiple accolades, including an Academy Award and two Golden Globe Awards.

Portman began her acting career at age twelve, when she starred as the young protégée of a hitman in the action film Léon: The Professional (1994). While in high school, she made her Broadway debut in a 1998 production of The Diary of a Young Girl and gained international recognition for starring as Padmé Amidala in Star Wars: Episode I – The Phantom Menace (1999). From 1999 to 2003, Portman attended Harvard University, graduating with a bachelor's degree in psychology. She reduced her number of acting roles, but continued to act in the Star Wars prequel trilogy (2002, 2005) and in The Public Theater's 2001 revival of Anton Chekhov's play The Seagull.

In 2004, Portman was nominated for the Academy Award for Best Supporting Actress and won a Golden Globe Award for playing a mysterious stripper in the romantic drama Closer. Portman's career further advanced with her starring roles as Evey Hammond in V for Vendetta (2005), Anne Boleyn in The Other Boleyn Girl (2008), and a troubled ballerina in the psychological horror film Black Swan (2010), for which she won the Academy Award for Best Actress. She went on to star in the romantic comedy No Strings Attached (2011) and portrayed Jacqueline Kennedy in the biopic Jackie (2016), which earned her a third Academy Award nomination. Portman has also featured as Jane Foster in the Marvel Cinematic Universe superhero films Thor (2011), Thor: The Dark World (2013), and Thor: Love and Thunder (2022), which established her as one of the world's highest-paid actresses.

Portman's directorial ventures include the short film Eve (2008) and the biographical drama A Tale of Love and Darkness (2015). She is vocal about the politics of the United States and Israel, and is an advocate for animal rights and environmental causes. She is married to dancer and choreographer Benjamin Millepied, with whom she has two children.

Early life and background
Natalie Hershlag was born on June 9, 1981, in Jerusalem, to Jewish parents with roots in Poland, Austria, and Russia. She is the only child of Shelley (née Stevens), an American homemaker who works as Portman's agent, and Avner Hershlag, an Israeli-born gynecologist. Her maternal grandparents were American Jews, whereas her paternal grandparents were Jewish immigrants to Israel.

Portman and her family first lived in Washington, D.C., but relocated to Connecticut in 1988 and then moved to Long Island in 1990. While living in Washington Portman attended Charles E. Smith Jewish Day School in Rockville, Maryland. Her native language is Hebrew. While living on Long Island, she attended a Jewish elementary school, the Solomon Schechter Day School of Nassau County. She studied ballet and modern dance at the American Theater Dance Workshop, and regularly attended the Usdan Center for the Creative and Performing Arts. Describing her early life, Portman has said that she was "different from the other kids. I was more ambitious. I knew what I liked and what I wanted, and I worked very hard. I was a very serious kid."

When Portman was ten years old, a Revlon agent spotted her at a pizza restaurant and asked her to become a child model. She turned down the offer but used the opportunity to get an acting agent. She auditioned for the 1992 off-Broadway Ruthless!, a musical about a girl who is prepared to commit murder to get the lead in a school play. Portman and Britney Spears were chosen as understudies for star Laura Bell Bundy.

Career

1994–1998: Early work
Six months after Ruthless! ended, Portman auditioned for and secured a leading role in Luc Besson's action drama Léon: The Professional (1994). To protect her privacy, she adopted her paternal grandmother's maiden name, Portman, as her stage name. She played Mathilda, an orphan child who befriends a middle-aged hitman (played by Jean Reno). Her parents were reluctant to let her do the part due to the explicit sexual and violent nature of the script, but agreed after Besson took out the nudity and the killings committed by Portman's character. Portman herself said that after those scenes were removed, she found nothing objectionable about the content. Even so, her mother was displeased with some of the "sexual twists and turns" in the finished film, which were not part of the script. Hal Hinson of The Washington Post commended Portman for bringing a "genuine sense of tragedy" to her part, but Peter Rainer of the Los Angeles Times believed that she wasn't "enough of an actress to unfold Mathilda's pain" and criticized Besson's sexualization of her character.

After filming The Professional, Portman went back to school and during the summer break of 1994, she filmed a part in Marya Cohn's short film Developing. In it she played a young girl coping with her mother's (played by Frances Conroy) cancer. She also enrolled at the Stagedoor Manor performing arts camp, where she played Anne Shirley in a staging of Anne of Green Gables. Michael Mann offered her the small part of the suicidal stepdaughter of Al Pacino's character in the action film Heat (1995) for her ability to portray dysfunction without hysteria. Impressed by her performance in The Professional, the director Ted Demme cast her as a precocious teenager who flirts with her much-older neighbor (played by Timothy Hutton) in the ensemble comedy-drama Beautiful Girls (1996). Janet Maslin of The New York Times wrote, "Portman, a budding knockout, is scene-stealingly good even in an overly showy role." She subsequently went back to Stagedoor Manor to appear in a production of the musical Cabaret. Also in 1996, Portman had brief roles in Woody Allen's musical Everyone Says I Love You and Tim Burton's comic science fiction film Mars Attacks!.

Portman was cast opposite Leonardo DiCaprio in Baz Luhrmann's Romeo + Juliet (1996), but she dropped out during rehearsals when studio executives found her too young for the role. Luhrmann said "Natalie was amazing in the footage, but it was too much of a burden for her at that age". She was also offered Adrian Lyne's Lolita, based on the novel of the same name, but she turned down the part due to its excessive sexual content. She later bemoaned that her parts in The Professional and Beautiful Girls prompted a series of offers to play a sexualized youngster, adding that it "dictated a lot of my choices afterwards 'cos it scared me ... it made me reluctant to do sexy stuff". Portman instead signed on to star as Anne Frank in a Broadway adaptation of The Diary of Anne Frank, which was staged at the Music Box Theatre from December 1997 to May 1998. In preparation, she twice visited the Anne Frank House in Amsterdam and interacted with Miep Gies, who had preserved Anne's diary after the family was captured; she found a connection with Frank's story, given her own family's history with the Holocaust. Reviewing the production for Variety, Greg Evans disliked her portrayal, which he thought had "little of the charm, budding genius or even brittle intelligence that the diary itself reveals". Conversely, Ben Brantley found an "ineffable grace in her awkwardness". The experience of performing the play was emotionally draining for her, as she attended high school during the day and performed at night; she wrote personal essays in Time and Seventeen magazines about her experience.

1999–2006: Star Wars, education, and transition to adult roles

Portman began filming the part of Padmé Amidala in the Star Wars prequel trilogy in 1997, which marked her first big-budget production. The first film of the series, Episode I – The Phantom Menace was released in 1999, when she was in her senior year of high school. Portman was unfamiliar with the franchise when she was cast, and watched the original Star Wars trilogy before filming began. She worked closely with the director George Lucas on her character's accent and mannerisms, and watched the films of Lauren Bacall, Audrey Hepburn, and Katharine Hepburn to draw inspiration from their voice and stature. Filming in arduous locations in Algeria proved challenging for Portman. She did not attend the film's premiere so she could study for her high school finals. Critics disliked the film but with earnings of $924 million worldwide it was the second highest-grossing film of all time to that point, and it established Portman as a global star.

Portman graduated from Syosset High School in 1999. Her high school paper, "A Simple Method to Demonstrate the Enzymatic Production of Hydrogen from Sugar", co-authored with scientists Ian Hurley and Jonathan Woodward, was entered in the Intel Science Talent Search. Following production on The Phantom Menace, Portman initially turned down a lead role in the coming-of-age film Anywhere but Here (1999) after learning it would involve a sex scene, but the director Wayne Wang and actress Susan Sarandon (who played Portman's mother in the film) demanded a rewrite of the script. She was shown a new draft, and decided to accept the part. Mary Elizabeth Williams of Salon called Portman's performance "astonishing" and added that "unlike any number of actresses her age, she's neither too maudlin nor too plucky". She received a Golden Globe Award for Best Supporting Actress nomination for it.

Portman's sole screen appearance in 2000 was in Where the Heart Is, a romantic drama filmed in Texas, in which she played a pregnant teenager. After finishing work on the film, she began attending Harvard University to pursue her bachelor's degree in psychology, and significantly reduced her acting roles over the next few years. She studied advanced Hebrew literature and neurobiology, and she served as Alan Dershowitz's research assistant. In the summer of 2001, she returned to Broadway (at the Delacorte Theater) to perform Chekhov's drama The Seagull, which was directed by Mike Nichols and co-starred Meryl Streep and Philip Seymour Hoffman. Linda Winer of Newsday wrote that the "major surprises come from Portman, whose Nina transforms with astonishing lyricism from the girl with ambition to Chekhov's most difficult symbol of destruction". Also in 2001, Portman was among several celebrities who made cameo appearances in the comedy Zoolander. The following year she reprised her role of Amidala in Star Wars: Episode II – Attack of the Clones, which she had filmed in Sydney and London during her summer break of 2000. She was excited by the opportunity to play a confident young woman who did not depend on the male lead. When asked about balancing her career and education, she said, "I don't care if [college] ruins my career. I'd rather be smart than a movie star." In 2002, she contributed to a study on memory called "Frontal lobe activation during object permanence: data from near-infrared spectroscopy". Portman graduated from Harvard in 2003 and her sole screen appearance that year was in the brief part of a young mother in the war film Cold Mountain.

Portman began 2004 by featuring in the romantic comedy Garden State, which was written and directed by its star Zach Braff. She was the first actor to sign on to the film after finding a connection with her part: a spirited young girl suffering from epilepsy. Her role in it was described by Nathan Rabin of The A.V. Club. as a prime example of the Manic Pixie Dream Girl character type – a stereotypical female role  designed to spiritually help a male protagonist. Portman later said she found it upsetting to have contributed to the trope. She followed it by playing a mysterious stripper in Closer, a romantic drama directed by Mike Nichols based on the play of the same name, and co-starring Julia Roberts, Jude Law, and Clive Owen. Portman agreed to her first sexually explicit adult role after turning down such parts in the past, saying it reflected her own maturity as a person. She had also performed her first nude scenes for the film, but they were deleted from the final cut when she insisted that they were inessential to the story. Closer grossed over $115 million worldwide against a $27 million budget, and the critic Peter Travers took note of Portman's "blazing, breakthrough performance", writing that she "digs so deep into the bruised core of her character that they seem to wear the same skin." She won the Golden Globe for Best Supporting Actress and received an Academy Award nomination in the same category.

Star Wars: Episode III – Revenge of the Sith, the final installment of the Star Wars prequel trilogy, was Portman's first film release of 2005. It earned over $848 million to rank as the second-highest-grossing film of the year. She next played a Jewish-American girl in Free Zone, a drama from Israeli filmmaker Amos Gitai. To prepare, she studied at the Hebrew University of Jerusalem and read memoirs of Yitzhak Rabin, which she said allowed her to explore both the role and her own heritage. Controversy arose when she filmed a kissing scene at the Western Wall, where gender segregation is enforced, and she later issued an apology. Critics disliked the film for its heavy-handed approach to the conflicts in the Middle East. Portman's final film role in 2005 was that of Evey Hammond in the political thriller V for Vendetta, based on the comics of the same name, about an alternative future where a neo-fascist regime has subjugated the United Kingdom. She was drawn to the provocative nature of the script, and worked with a dialect coach to speak in an English accent. In a scene in which her character is tortured, her head was shaved on camera; she considered it an opportunity to rid herself of vanity. Ruthe Stein of the San Francisco Chronicle deemed it Portman's strongest performance to that point, and remarked that she "keeps you focused on her words and actions instead of her bald head." She was awarded the Saturn Award for Best Actress.

Portman began 2006 by hosting an episode of the television sketch comedy show Saturday Night Live. One of her sketches, a song named "Natalie's Rap", was released later in 2009 on Incredibad, an album by the Lonely Island. In the anthology film Paris, je t'aime, consisting of eighteen short films, she had a role in the segment named "Faubourg Saint-Denis" from director Tom Tykwer. Later that year, she starred in Miloš Forman's Goya's Ghosts, about the painter Francisco Goya. Forman cast her in the film after finding a resemblance between her and Goya's portrait The Milkmaid of Bordeaux. She insisted on using a body double for her nude scenes after discovering on set that she had to perform them when they were not originally in the script. It received predominantly negative reviews, but Roger Ebert was appreciative of Portman for playing her dual role "with fearless conviction".

2007–2015: Career expansion and Black Swan

Portman began 2007 by replacing Jodie Foster in Wong Kar-wai's romantic drama My Blueberry Nights, which was his first English-language film. For her role as a gambler, she trained with a poker coach. Richard Corliss of Time magazine believed that "for once she's not playing a waif or a child princess but a mature, full-bodied woman" and commended her "vibrancy, grittiness and ache, all performed with a virtuosa's easy assurance". Her next appearance was in Hotel Chevalier, a short film from Wes Anderson, which served as a prologue to his feature The Darjeeling Limited (in which Portman had a cameo). In the short, she and Jason Schwartzman play former lovers who reunite in a Paris hotel room. For the first time, Portman performed an extended nude scene; she was later disappointed at the undue focus on it and she subsequently swore off appearing nude again. Keen to work in different genres, Portman accepted a role in the children's film Mr. Magorium's Wonder Emporium, playing an employee of a magical toy store. She also appeared in Paul McCartney's music video "Dance Tonight" from his album Memory Almost Full, directed by Michel Gondry.

Scarlett Johansson and Portman portrayed rival sisters Mary and Anne Boleyn, respectively, in the period film The Other Boleyn Girl (2008). She was excited by the opportunity to work opposite another actress her age, bemoaning that such casting was rare in film. Derek Elley of Variety was critical of Portman's English accent and wrote that she "doesn't quite bring the necessary heft to make Anne a truly dominant power player". The film had modest box-office earnings. She served as a jury member of the 2008 Cannes Film Festival and also launched her own production company, named handsomecharlie films, after her late dog. Portman's directorial debut, the short film Eve, opened the short-film screenings at the 65th Venice International Film Festival. It is about a young woman who goes to her grandmother's romantic date, and Portman drew inspiration for the older character (played by Lauren Bacall) from her own grandmother.

A poorly received adaptation of Ayelet Waldman's novel Love and Other Impossible Pursuits, entitled The Other Woman, marked Portman's first film role of 2009. She appeared in a faux perfume commercial called Greed, directed by Roman Polanski, and in the anthology film New York, I Love You, she directed a segment and also starred in a different segment directed by Mira Nair. Portman next took on a role opposite Tobey Maguire and Jake Gyllenhaal in the drama film Brothers, a remake of the 2004 Danish film of the same name. Her role was that of a war widow, for which she spoke with military wives to prepare. The film was shot during the 2007–08 Writers Guild of America strike, and Portman found it challenging to shoot certain scenes without a written script. Claudia Puig of USA Today found her to be "subdued and reactive in a part that doesn't call for her to do much else".

After producing and co-starring alongside Joseph Gordon-Levitt in the black comedy Hesher (2010), Portman played a ballerina overwhelmed with the prospect of performing Swan Lake in Darren Aronofsky's psychological horror film Black Swan. She was trained by the professional ballerina Mary Helen Bowers, and in preparation, she trained for five to eight hours daily for six months and lost . Her performance was acclaimed; writing for Empire, Dan Jolin found her to be "simultaneously at her most vulnerable and her most predatory, at once frostily brittle and raunchily malleable [...] before peaking at the film's denouement with a raw, alluring showstopper of a performance." Black Swan emerged as a sleeper hit, grossing over $329 million worldwide against a $13 million budget, and earned Portman several prizes including the Academy Award for Best Actress. Following her Oscar win, controversy arose over who performed the bulk of the on-screen dancing in the film. Sarah Lane, one of Portman's dancing doubles in the film, claimed that the actress performed only about five percent of the full-body shots, adding that she was asked by the film's producers not to speak publicly about it during awards season. Aronofsky defended Portman by insisting that she had performed 80 percent of the on-screen dancing.

Portman next served as an executive producer for No Strings Attached (2011), a romantic comedy in which she starred with Ashton Kutcher as a young couple in a casual sex relationship. She described the experience of making it as a "palate cleanser" from the intensity of Black Swan. It received unfavorable reviews but was a commercial success. She next agreed to the film Your Highness for the opportunity of playing an athletic and foul-mouthed character, which she believed was rare for actresses. Critics were dismissive of the film's reliance on scatological humor and it proved to be a box-office bomb. In her final film release of 2011, Portman took on the part of Jane Foster, a scientist and love-interest of the titular character (played by Chris Hemsworth) in the Marvel Cinematic Universe superhero film Thor. She liked the idea of Kenneth Branagh directing a big-budget film that emphasized character; she signed on to it before receiving a script, and helped develop her part by reading the biography of scientists such as Rosalind Franklin. Richard Kuipers of Variety commended Portman's "sterling work in a thinly written role" for adding dimension to the film's romantic subplot. Thor earned $449.3 million worldwide to emerge as the 15th highest-grossing film of 2011.

In 2012, Portman topped Forbes listing of the most bankable stars in Hollywood. Her sole screen appearance that year was in Paul McCartney's music video "My Valentine", alongside Johnny Depp. The following year, she reprised the role of Jane Foster in Thor: The Dark World, which earned over $644 million worldwide to emerge as the 10th highest-grossing film of 2013. Forbes featured her in their Celebrity 100 listing of 2014, and estimated her income from the previous year to be $13 million.

In 2015, Portman appeared alongside an ensemble cast, including Christian Bale, in Terrence Malick's experimental drama film Knight of Cups, which marked her first project after giving birth. She shot for it within a week of returning to work and she did not receive a traditional script or dialogues, improvising most of her scenes with Bale. She said that shooting with Malick influenced her own directorial venture, A Tale of Love and Darkness which was released in the same year. Based on Israeli author Amos Oz's autobiographical novel of the same name which is set in Jerusalem during the last years of the British Mandate of Palestine, the Hebrew-language film starred Portman who also produced and co-wrote it. She had wanted to adapt the book since she first read it a decade ago, but postponed it until she was old enough to play the leading role of a mother herself. She collaborated closely with Amos, showing him drafts of her script as she adapted the book. A. O. Scott of The New York Times found it to be a "conscientious adaptation of a difficult book" and was appreciative of Portman's potential as a filmmaker. She next produced and starred in the western film Jane Got a Gun about a young mother seeking vengeance. Initially scheduled to be directed by Lynne Ramsay, the production was plagued with numerous difficulties. Ramsay did not turn up on set for the first day of filming and was eventually replaced with Gavin O'Connor. Michael Fassbender, Jude Law, and Bradley Cooper were all cast as the male lead, before Ewan McGregor played the part. Peter Bradshaw of The Guardian reviewed that Portman's "stately performance" was not enough to save the "laborious and solemn western", and it grossed less than $4 million against its $25 million budget.

2016–present: Jackie and beyond

Portman portrayed Jacqueline Kennedy in the Pablo Larraín-directed biopic Jackie (2016), about Kennedy's life immediately after the 1963 assassination of her husband. She was initially intimidated to take on the part of a well-known public figure, and eventually researched Kennedy extensively by watching videos of her, reading books, and listening to audiotapes of her interviews. She also worked with a dialect coach to adopt Kennedy's unique speaking style. David Rooney of The Hollywood Reporter termed it an "incandescent performance" and added that "her Jackie is both inscrutable and naked, broken but unquestionably resilient, a mess and yet fiercely dignified". She won the Critics' Choice Movie Award for Best Actress and received a nomination for the Academy Award for Best Actress. She also served as producer for the comedy horror film Pride and Prejudice and Zombies, directed by Burr Steers, and starred in Rebecca Zlotowski's French-Belgian drama Planetarium. The 2017 experimental romance Song to Song marked Portman's second collaboration with Terrence Malick, which like their previous film polarized critics.

In 2018, Portman starred in the science fiction film Annihilation, based on Jeff VanderMeer's novel. She played a biologist and former soldier who studies a mysterious quarantined zone of mutating organisms. She was pleased to headline a rare female-led science fiction film, and she moved her family near Pinewood Studios during filming. For the action sequences, she underwent movement training with the dancer Bobbi Jene Smith. Benjamin Lee of The Guardian took note of Portman's "strong, fiercely compelling presence" and commended her for playing the part without unnecessary sentimentality. It only received a limited theatrical release and was distributed on Netflix internationally. Her next appearance was in Xavier Dolan's first English-language film, the ensemble drama The Death & Life of John F. Donovan (2018), which was termed a "shocking misfire" by Eric Kohn of IndieWire. She then starred as a troubled pop singer in Vox Lux, sharing the part with Raffey Cassidy. She was drawn to the idea of showcasing the negative effects of fame, and in preparation, she watched documentaries on musicians and listened to the music of Sia, who wrote her songs in the film. For the climactic dance routines, she trained with her husband, Benjamin Millepied, who choreographed the sequence. It received mixed reviews from critics, but Portman's performance earned unanimous praise. Comparing it to her performances in Black Swan and Jackie, Robbie Collin of The Daily Telegraph wrote that "this role has a similar audacity and extravagance that few actresses would dare attempt, let alone be allowed to get away with".

Unused footage from Thor: The Dark World and a new voice-over was used for Portman's brief appearance in the 2019 superhero film Avengers: Endgame. She then portrayed a psychologically troubled astronaut (based on Lisa Nowak) in the drama Lucy in the Sky, directed by Noah Hawley. She replaced the film's producer Reese Witherspoon, who backed out due to a scheduling conflict. The film was poorly received, though Portman's performance was praised. The following year, she narrated the Disney+ nature documentary Dolphin Reef and voiced Jane Foster in the animated series What If...?. In 2022, Portman reprised her role as Foster in the sequel Thor: Love and Thunder, in which her character becomes Mighty Thor. She agreed to return to the franchise after meeting with director Taika Waititi, who offered to portray her character in an "adventurous and fun and funny" way. Nick Allen at RogerEbert.com opined, "In both her human and her heroic state, Portman’s performance conveys why it's great to see Jane again." In a 2022 readers' poll by Empire magazine, Portman was voted one of the 50 greatest actors of all time.

Portman and her producing partner, Sophie Mas, founded the production company MountainA in 2021, and signed a first-look television deal with Apple TV+. Their first project will be Lady in the Lake, a miniseries adaptation of Laura Lippman's novel of the same name, starring Portman. Portman will also star opposite Julianne Moore in Todd Haynes' romantic drama film May December.

Activism
Portman, who is an advocate for animal rights, became a vegetarian at age eight, a decision which came after she witnessed a demonstration of laser surgery on a chicken while attending a medical conference with her father. She became a vegan in 2009 after reading Jonathan Safran Foer's Eating Animals and later produced a documentary on factory farming systems in the U.S. by the same title. In September 2017, she was recognized for her work on the film by the Environmental Media Association Awards with the Ongoing Commitment Award. She does not wear animal products and has praised animal-friendly products designed by Stella McCartney and Target. In 2007, she launched her own brand of animal-friendly footwear. In 2007, Portman traveled to Rwanda with Jack Hanna, to film the documentary, Gorillas on the Brink. Portman has been an advocate of environmental causes since childhood, when she joined an environmental song and dance troupe known as World Patrol Kids.

Portman has also supported anti-poverty causes. In 2004 and 2005, she traveled to Uganda, Guatemala, and Ecuador as the Ambassador of Hope for FINCA International, an organization that promotes micro-lending to help finance women-owned businesses in developing countries. In an interview appearing on the PBS program Foreign Exchange with Fareed Zakaria, she discussed microfinance. Host Fareed Zakaria said that he was "generally wary of celebrities with fashionable causes", but included the segment with Portman because "she really knew her stuff". On This Week with George Stephanopoulos in April 2007, Portman discussed her work with FINCA and how it can benefit women and children in Third World countries. In fall-2007, she visited several university campuses, including Harvard, USC, UCLA, UC Berkeley, Stanford, Princeton, New York University, and Columbia, to inspire students with the power of microfinance and to encourage them to join the Village Banking Campaign to help families and communities lift themselves out of poverty.

Portman is a supporter of the Democratic Party, and for the 2004 presidential election she campaigned for Senator John Kerry. Prior to the 2008 presidential election, she supported Senator Hillary Clinton of New York in the Democratic primaries. Portman later campaigned for Senator Barack Obama of Illinois. In a 2008 interview, she also stated: "I even like John McCain. I disagree with his war stance – which is a really big deal – but I think he's a very moral person." In 2010, her activist work and popularity with young people earned her a nomination for VH1's Do Something Awards, which is dedicated to honoring individuals who do good. In 2011, Portman and her then-fiancé Benjamin Millepied were among the signers of a petition to President Obama in support of same-sex marriage. She supported Obama's re-election campaign in 2012.

In 2009, Portman signed a petition that defended Roman Polanski, who was charged with drugging and raping a thirteen-year-old girl in 1977, and has been a fugitive for decades. In February 2018, she expressed regret over signing the petition.

In January 2011, Portman was appointed an ambassador of WE Charity (formerly known as Free The Children), an international charity and educational partner, spearheading their Power of a Girl campaign. She hosted a contest challenging girls in North America to fundraise for one of WE Charity's all-girl schools in Kenya. As incentives for the contest winner, Portman offered the designer Rodarte dress she wore to the premiere of Black Swan, along with tickets to her next film premiere. It was announced in May 2012 that Portman would be working with watch designer Richard Mille to develop a limited-edition timepiece with proceeds supporting WE Charity. During WE Day California 2019 Portman gave a pro vegan speech in front of the student audience, linking vegan lifestyle and feminism. In December 2019, she visited Kenya a second time with WE Charity and spoke with young girls determined to improve their lives through access to education.

In 2006, Portman served as a guest lecturer at Columbia University for a course in terrorism and counterterrorism, where she spoke about her film V for Vendetta. In February 2015, Portman was among other alumni of Harvard University including Robert F. Kennedy Jr., Darren Aronofsky and Susan Faludi who wrote an open letter to the school demanding it divest its $35,900,000,000 endowment from coal, gas, and oil companies. Later that year in May, she spoke at the annual Harvard Class Day to the graduating class of 2015.

At Harvard, Portman wrote a letter to The Harvard Crimson in response to an essay critical of Israeli actions toward Palestinians. She has nevertheless criticized the Israeli government, specifically Prime Minister Benjamin Netanyahu. Portman was critical of Netanyahu's re-election in 2015, saying she was "disappointed" and often found his comments racist. In November 2017, Portman was announced as the Genesis Prize recipient for 2018, which includes $2,000,000 in prize money. The following April, Portman announced that she did not plan to attend the awards ceremony scheduled for June, citing "recent events in Israel" that left her feeling uncomfortable attending public events there. The ceremony was canceled. Portman further clarified that she was not boycotting Israel, explaining that she did not want to "appear as endorsing" Netanyahu, who was to give a speech at the ceremony. She is also a member of the One Voice movement.

In January 2018, she donated $50,000 to the Time's Up initiative. Portman took part in the 2018 Women's March in Los Angeles, where she spoke about the "sexual terrorism" she experienced at age thirteen after the release of her film Léon: The Professional. She told the crowd, "I understood very quickly, even as a 13-year-old, that if I were to express myself sexually I would feel unsafe and that men would feel entitled to discuss and objectify my body to my great discomfort." She drew attention to the MeToo movement, revealing that her first fan letter was a "rape fantasy" from a man and that her local radio station created a countdown until her eighteenth birthday (when she would reach legal age to consent to have intercourse).

In 2020, Portman endorsed the "defund the police" movement. In 2020, Portman collaborated with JusticeLA to create a public service announcement #SuingToSaveLives about the health of people in L.A. County jails amid the COVID-19 pandemic. Later in 2020, Portman was announced as one of the co-founders and investors in an almost all-female group that was awarded a new franchise in the National Women's Soccer League, the top level of the women's sport in the U.S. The new team, since unveiled as Angel City FC, began play in the 2022 NWSL season.

Personal life and endorsements

Portman is married to French dancer and choreographer Benjamin Millepied, with whom she has two children. The couple began dating in 2009 after having met while working together on the set of Black Swan, and wed in a Jewish ceremony held in Big Sur, California, on August 4, 2012. The family lived in Paris for a time after Millepied accepted the position of director of dance with the Paris Opera Ballet, and Portman has expressed a desire to become a French citizen. In 2013, she was living in Los Angeles. In 2017 she bought a Montecito mansion, which she sold in 2021 for $8 million.

In 2006, Portman commented that she felt more Jewish in Israel and that she would like to raise her children Jewish: "A priority for me is definitely that I'd like to raise my kids Jewish, but the ultimate thing is to have someone who is a good person and who is a partner." In January 2014, Millepied said he was in the process of converting to Judaism.

In 2010, Portman signed on with Dior and appeared in several of the company's advertising campaigns. In October 2012, Britain's Advertising Standards Authority banned a Dior advertisement that featured Portman wearing Dior mascara after a complaint from Dior's competitor, L'Oreal, saying that the advert "misleadingly exaggerated the likely effects of the product". The ASA ruled that "the ad was likely to mislead". Portman is the face of one of the company's fragrances, Miss Dior, inspired by Catherine Dior. She has starred in campaign videos for the fragrance, and promoted a new version of the fragrance, Rose N'Roses, in 2021.

Filmography and awards

Portman's most acclaimed and highest-grossing films, according to the online portal Box Office Mojo and the review aggregate site Rotten Tomatoes, include Star Wars: Episode I – The Phantom Menace (1999), Star Wars: Episode II – Attack of the Clones (2002), Closer (2004), Star Wars: Episode III – Revenge of the Sith (2005), V for Vendetta (2005), Black Swan (2010), No Strings Attached (2011), Thor (2011), Thor: The Dark World (2013), Jackie (2016), and Annihilation (2018).

Portman was awarded the Golden Globe Award for Best Actress in a Drama and the Academy Award for Best Actress for her performance in Black Swan, and the Golden Globe Award for Best Supporting Actress for Closer. She has received two more Academy Award nominations: Best Supporting Actress for Closer and Best Actress for Jackie; and two more Golden Globe nominations: Best Supporting Actress for Anywhere but Here (1999) and Best Actress in a Drama for Jackie.

See also 
List of actors with Academy Award nominations
List of actors with two or more Academy Award nominations in acting categories
List of Israeli Academy Award winners and nominees
List of Jewish Academy Award winners and nominees

Notes

References

Bibliography

External links 

 
 
 
 

 
1981 births
Living people
20th-century American actresses
21st-century American actresses
Actresses from Connecticut
Actresses from Jerusalem
Actresses from Los Angeles
Actresses from New York City
Actresses from Paris
Actresses from Washington, D.C.
American animal rights activists
American child actresses
American expatriate actresses in France
American female models
American film actresses
American film producers
American Jews
American people of Israeli descent
American stage actresses
American television actresses
American women film producers
Angel City FC owners
Angel City FC founders
Best Actress Academy Award winners
Best Actress BAFTA Award winners
Best Drama Actress Golden Globe (film) winners
Best Supporting Actress Golden Globe (film) winners
Harvard University alumni
Hebrew University of Jerusalem alumni
Independent Spirit Award for Best Female Lead winners
Israeli animal rights activists
Israeli child actresses
Israeli emigrants to the United States
Israeli expatriates in France
Israeli film actresses
Israeli film producers
Israeli people of American-Jewish descent
Israeli stage actresses
Israeli television actresses
Jewish activists
Jewish American actresses
Jewish Israeli actresses
Outstanding Performance by a Female Actor in a Leading Role Screen Actors Guild Award winners
People from Long Island
Syosset High School alumni
American veganism activists
Israeli female models